The 2016–17 Milwaukee Panthers men's basketball team represented the University of Wisconsin–Milwaukee during the 2016–17 NCAA Division I men's basketball season. The Panthers, led by first-year head coach LaVall Jordan, played their home games at the UW–Milwaukee Panther Arena and the Klotsche Center as members of the Horizon League. They finished the season 11–24, 4–14 in Horizon League play to finish in last place. They defeated Detroit, Valparaiso and UIC to advance to the championship game of the Horizon League tournament where they lost to Northern Kentucky.

On June 12, 2017, head coach LaVall Jordan left the school to accept the head coaching position at Butler, his alma mater. On June 20, the school named Northwestern assistant Patrick Baldwin head coach.

Previous season
The Panthers finished the 2015–16 season 20–13, 10–8 in Horizon League play to finish in fifth place. They defeated Northern Kentucky in the first round of the Horizon League tournament to advance to the second round where they lost to Green Bay. Despite having 20 wins, they did not participate in a postseason tournament.

On March 17, 2016 head coach Rob Jeter was fired. He finished at Milwaukee with an 11-year record of 185–170. On April 7, the school hired LaVall Jordan as head coach.

Departures

Incoming Transfers

Recruiting class of 2016

Recruiting class of 2017

Roster

Schedule and results

|-
!colspan=9 style=| Exhibition

|-
!colspan=9 style=| Non-conference regular season

|-
!colspan=9 style=| Horizon League regular season

|-
!colspan=9 style=|Horizon League tournament

References

Milwaukee
Milwaukee Panthers men's basketball seasons